Ninette Lina Ron Pereira (September 23, 1959 – March 5, 2011) was a Venezuelan political leader. She was the founder and president of the Venezuelan Popular Unity party, one of the parties which supported President Hugo Chávez. Ron ran one of the Bolivarian Circles. She died of a heart attack in 2011 at the age of 51 and was buried in the South Cemetery of Plaza Andrés Eloy Blanco.  President Chávez extolled her as "a true soldier of the people" and a "complete revolutionary."

Early life
Lina Ron was born in Anaco, in the state of Anzoategui on September 23, 1959. She was the fourth child of Manuel Ron Chira, a political leader, and Herminia Pereira. She and her six brothers plus eight cousins were raised by Lina Ron's mother after her father Manuel went to prison after being convicted of murder.

Political career
She moved to Caracas at the age of 27 and worked in a shopping mall before becoming a leftist student leader in the Comité de Luchas Populares (CLP), where she agitated supposedly in favor of students and street vendors.  She dyed her hair platinum-blond and played an important role as an activist.

Political approach
Ron was very aggressive and volatile in her radical political approach to the point that even Chávez called her "uncontrollable", and she even labelled herself as the "ugly part" of the "revolution". She was also a leader of one of the Bolivarian Circles called La Piedrita stating that such circles were "armed to the teeth". In 2008, she and her companions had attacked the Archbishop's Palace in Caracas and irascibly evicted people who were there, and had adamantly demanded the support of the Catholic Church to the cause of the revolution. In 2009, Ron led an armed attack on Globovisión, where she and attackers threw tear gas into the headquarters of the news organization that left injured multiple individuals inside and threatened its security with firearms. She then went to jail for three months following the 2009 attack and was allegedly recommended to be placed on the United States' Visas Viper for suspected terrorists due to the violent actions.

Death
On 5 March 2011, Andrés Izarra, then head of the Ministry of Popular Power for Communication and Information announced that Lina Ron died of "coronary obstructive disease of long standing". Officials of the Bello Monte morgue in Caracas ruled that she did not die of a rumored drug overdose since there were no leaks found on any of her organs. Following the death of Ron, President Chávez stated that she "was a sharp sword and living flame of popular socialist Bolivarian Revolution" and that "with the departure of Lina Ron the sword sharpens more and the flame grows more".

References

1959 births
2011 deaths
21st-century Venezuelan women politicians
21st-century Venezuelan politicians
People from Anzoátegui
Venezuelan Popular Unity politicians
Political party founders
Women founders